Lubombo may refer to:
 Lubombo District, Eswatini
 Lubombo Mountains, Southern Africa